Helsingør Municipality had have Conservative rule for 22 of the last 26 years. . Venstre had held the mayor's position in the 4 other years, after making an agreement with 3 parties of the red bloc following the 2009 election
. However, in 2013, Benedikte Kiær would win the mayor's position back to Conservatives.

In the 2017 election, Conservatives had won 9 seats, and would become the sole largest party for the 7th time in a row. However none of the traditional blocs had a majority without local party Lokaldemokraterne. The result would be that the Conservatives
with Benedikte Kiær as mayoral candidate, would be able to reach a broad agreement with the Social Democrats, the Danish Social Liberal Party, Danish People's Party and Venstre.

In this election, once again the Conservatives would become the largest party. They won a total of 10 seats, the most since the 2001 election. The traditional blue bloc had won 13 seats, and it looked like Benedikte Kiær could continue as mayor. The bloc would eventually make use of its majority, and on the eletion night it could be announced that she would continue as mayor.

Electoral system
For elections to Danish municipalities, a number varying from 9 to 31 are chosen to be elected to the municipal council. The seats are then allocated using the D'Hondt method and a closed list proportional representation.
Helsingør Municipality had 25 seats in 2021

Unlike in Danish General Elections, in elections to municipal councils, electoral alliances are allowed.

Electoral alliances  

Electoral Alliance 1

Electoral Alliance 2

Electoral Alliance 3

Results

Notes

References 

Helsingør